José Manuel Ferreira Neves (born June 1974) is a Portuguese billionaire and the founder of Farfetch, a global luxury fashion online platform.

Early life
José Neves was born in June 1974. He grew up in Porto, Portugal, where his grandfather owned a shoe factory. He studied economics at the University of Porto.

Career
Neves founded his first tech company, Grey Matter, while studying at university. The company provided software for clothing manufacturers.

In the same year, he founded a software firm called Platforme for small fashion brands in 1996. In 1996, at the age of 22, he launched a footwear brand named Swear, and opened a store in London. The brand sold to other shops. He started a retail fashion store named bstore on Savile Row in London in 2001.

In 2008, Neves founded Farfetch. In June 2017, Farfetch sold a minority stake to JD.com, for US$397 million, prior to launching in China.

In September 2018, following the IPO of Farfetch on the New York Stock Exchange, Neves' stake in the company was valued at US$1.4 billion.

Personal life
Neves is married and has five children, living in Guimarães, Portugal. Neves has an apartment in Clerkenwell, London, and travels widely for work.

References

1974 births
Living people
People from Porto
University of Porto alumni
Portuguese billionaires
People from Guimarães